Hathor 19 - Coptic Calendar - Hathor 21

The twentieth day of the Coptic month of Hathor, the third month of the Coptic year.  On a common year, this day corresponds to November 16, of the Julian Calendar, and November 29, of the Gregorian Calendar. This day falls in the Coptic season of Peret, the season of emergence. This day falls in the Nativity Fast.

Commemorations

Saints 

 The departure of Pope Anianus, the second Patriarch of the See of Saint Mark

Other commemorations 

 The consecration of the Churches of Saint Theodore of Shotb and Saint Theodore El-Mashriqi

References 

Days of the Coptic calendar